Merville – Calonne Airport  is a regional airport in France. The airport supports general aviation with no commercial airline service scheduled.

History
The airport was originally built by Nazi Germany after the occupation of France in 1940 as a Luftwaffe base (Fliegerhorst Merville), as part of the defences of the Pas de Calais area. After the area was liberated in 1944 it was converted by United States Army Air Forces engineers into an allied airfield. The airport was used by the Royal Air Force as Advanced Landing Ground B-53 Merville.

The airfield has numerous wartime relics, including many bunkers.

Facilities
The airport has air traffic control services and two runways oriented north-south (04/22):
 A paved runway of  
 A  grass runway.

There is a small terminal building and a restaurant.

Statistics

References

 French Wikipedia article
 Johnson, David C. (1988), U.S. Army Air Forces Continental Airfields (ETO), D-Day to V-E Day; Research Division, USAF Historical Research Center, Maxwell AFB, Alabama.

External links

Airports in Hauts-de-France
Nord (French department)